is a Japanese voice actress from Kōchi Prefecture. She was formerly affiliated with Mausu Promotion, and is now affiliated with Mediaforce.

Voice roles

Television animation
Hakken Taiken Daisuki! Shimajirō (Ken)
ReBoot (Enzo Matrix)
Sorcerer Hunters (Girl)
Transformers: Armada (Young Rad)
Uninhabited Planet Survive! (Classmate #3)
X-Men: Evolution (Wolfsbane, Jamie Madrox)

Video games
Crash Boom Bang! (Tawna)
Sakura Taisen V ~Saraba Itoshiki Hitoyo~ (Jinjin)
Crash Bandicoot 4: It's About Time (Tawna)

Dubbing roles
Blow (Young George Jung)
Diagnosis Murder (Dr. Amanda Bentley)
Dude, Where's My Car? (Wilma)
Gosford Park (Mabel)
The Human Centipede (First Sequence) (Jenny (Ashlynn Yennie))
Red Dragon (Billy Leeds, Young Francis Dolarhyde)
Shall We Dance? (Tina)

References

External links
Mediaforce profile
Mausu Promotion profile

1973 births
Japanese video game actresses
Japanese voice actresses
Living people
Voice actors from Kōchi Prefecture
Voice actresses from Kōchi Prefecture
Mausu Promotion voice actors
20th-century Japanese actresses
21st-century Japanese actresses